Listen to My Heart is an album by Nancy LaMott, released in 1995. The title track, which was written by David Friedman, became LaMott's signature tune. 

LaMott recorded the album in two days, after postponing a hysterectomy needed because of uterine cancer. The album has sold more than 100,000 copies.

Critical reception
The New York Times wrote: "A grown-up girl-next-door with a sweet throb of a voice and a classicist's respect for the outlines of a song, LaMott comes as close as anyone nowadays to being a songwriter's ideal interpreter."

Track list

References

1995 albums